Aero Gare was a kitplane manufacturer founded by Gary LeGare in Mojave, California to marketed the Sea Hawker amphibious aircraft. It sold all rights to the design to Aero Composites in 1986.

Defunct aircraft manufacturers of the United States
Mojave, California
Companies based in Kern County, California
Defunct manufacturing companies based in California